The 2021–22 season was the 64th season in the existence of FC Khimki and the club's 19th consecutive season in the top flight of Russian football. In addition to the domestic league, FC Khimki are participating in this season's editions of the Russian Cup.

Season events
On 19 March, Filip Dagerstål, Didier Lamkel Zé and Bruno Viana all suspended their contracts with Khimki.

Players

Contract suspensions

Out on loan

Transfers

Pre-season and friendlies

Competitions

Overview

Premier League

League table

Results summary

Results by round

Matches

Relegation play-offs

Russian Cup

Round of 32

Squad statistics

Appearances and goals

|-
|colspan="14"|Players who suspended their contracts:

|-
|colspan="14"|Players away from the club on loan:

|-
|colspan="14"|Players who left Khimki during the season:

|}

Goal scorers

Clean sheets

Disciplinary record

References

External links

FC Khimki seasons
FC Khimki